Stanislaus "Stan" Henricus Christina Valckx (born 20 October 1963) is a Dutch former professional footballer who played as a central defender.

Club career
Valckx was born in Arcen, Limburg. After starting professionally with VVV-Venlo (second division), he moved in 1988 to Eredivisie club PSV Eindhoven, being instrumental in the conquest of three leagues and two Dutch Cups – in the 1991–92 season, he scored four goals in 28 matches as the team renewed their domestic supremacy.

In 1992, Valckx, aged 28, moved abroad, to Sporting Clube de Portugal, helping the Lisbon side to the Portuguese Cup three years later, although he did not play in the final against C.S. Marítimo as in October 1994 he had already returned to his country and PSV, where he won one more league and another domestic cup before retiring in June 2000 at nearly 37 years of age, with more than 500 official appearances to his credit.

International career
Valckx earned 20 caps for the Netherlands, and was picked for the squad which appeared at the 1994 FIFA World Cup. He contributed with four games, in a quarter-final elimination at the hands of eventual champions Brazil.

Valckx made his debut for his country on 26 September 1990, in a friendly against Italy (0–0).

Honours

Club
PSV
Eredivisie: 1988–89, 1990–91, 1991–92, 1996–97, 1999–00
KNVB Cup: 1988–89, 1989–90, 1995–96
Johan Cruijff Schaal: 1996, 1997, 1998
UEFA Super Cup: Runner-up 1988
Intercontinental Cup: Runner-up 1988

Sporting
Taça de Portugal: 1994–95

Post-playing career
Subsequently, Valckx began working as a technical director at PSV, a post he occupied for several years. In 2008, he got into a conflict with general manager Jan Reker about the influence and role of player agent Vlado Lemić at the club; the following year, in the same capacity, he joined China's Shanghai Shenhua FC.

In August 2010, Valckx was appointed director of football at Wisła Kraków from Poland. Four years later, he returned to VVV as a technical advisor.

References

External links
Beijen profile 

1963 births
Living people
People from Arcen en Velden
Dutch footballers
Association football defenders
Eerste Divisie players
Eredivisie players
VVV-Venlo players
PSV Eindhoven players
Primeira Liga players
Sporting CP footballers
Netherlands international footballers
1994 FIFA World Cup players
Dutch expatriate footballers
Expatriate footballers in Portugal
Dutch expatriate sportspeople in Portugal
Footballers from Limburg (Netherlands)